Kevin Fend (born 8 April 1990) is an Austrian footballer who plays for Dornbirner SV.

External links
 

1990 births
Living people
Association football goalkeepers
Austrian footballers
SC Rheindorf Altach players
SV Grödig players
SV Elversberg players
Austrian Football Bundesliga players
Austrian expatriate footballers
Expatriate footballers in Germany
Austrian expatriate sportspeople in Germany
People from Hohenems
Footballers from Vorarlberg